Northern Ireland Sign language (NISL) is a sign language used mainly by deaf people in Northern Ireland.

NISL is described as being related to Irish Sign Language (ISL) at the syntactic level while the lexicon is based on British Sign Language (BSL) and American Sign Language (ASL).

A number of practitioners see Northern Ireland Sign Language as a distinct and separate language from both BSL and ISL though "many 'Anglo-Irish' Northern Irish signers argue against the use of the acronym NISL and believe that while their variety is distinct, it is still a part of British Sign Language."

 the British Government recognises only British Sign Language and Irish Sign Language as the official sign languages used in Northern Ireland.

References

BANZSL Sign Language family
Languages of Northern Ireland
Deaf culture in the United Kingdom
Sign languages of the United Kingdom